Asian mole shrews (Anourosorex) are a genus of shrews that resemble moles, from China, Taiwan, India, and Indochina. They are the only known genus of the Anourosoricini tribe of red-toothed shrews. The four known species are:

Assam mole shrew (A. assamensis) 
Giant mole shrew (A. schmidi) 
Chinese mole shrew (A. squamipes) 
Taiwanese mole shrew (A. yamashinai)
†Japanese mole shrew (A. japonicus)

References